Gary Loo is a Singaporean footballer who plays for Balestier Khalsa FC as a midfielder. He started his career with Tanjong Pagar in 2011.

Club career
Loo started his career in 2011 where he played for the Tanjong Pagar United FC where he made 30 league appearances.

He then move to the Under–23 team, Young Lions for the 2012 S.League campaign.

After being clubless, or a free agent for 3 to 4 years, he finally get to be back in the S.League where he played for Balestier.

Career statistics

Club

. Caps and goals may not be correct.

 Young Lions are ineligible for qualification to AFC competitions in their respective leagues.
 Young Lions withdrew from the 2012 Singapore Cup, due to participation in AFC and AFF youth competitions.

References

Living people
1992 births
Singaporean footballers
Singaporean sportspeople of Chinese descent
Association football midfielders
Tanjong Pagar United FC players
Young Lions FC players
Balestier Khalsa FC players
Singapore Premier League players